Carol Lim (born February 20, 1975) is an American fashion designer, retailer and creative director, who works in partnership with Humberto Leon.

She founded the fashion retailer Opening Ceremony in 2002 in Lower Manhattan. Further stores followed in New York City, as well as in Los Angeles and Tokyo. An Opening Ceremony store opened in 2012 in London, coinciding with the Olympics.

In 2011, Lim was announced as creative director of the French high fashion brand Kenzo, which was founded in 1970 and is part of the LVMH luxury goods conglomerate.

Early life
Carol Lim is the daughter of Korean parents. Born and raised in the Los Angeles suburbs. After graduating with a degree in economics in 1997, Lim worked in the corporate sphere, including a spell with Deloitte, before moving to New York and becoming a merchandise planner for Bally.

Career
At age 25, Lim went on a trip to Hong Kong, where she inspired to open a store. Its concept was to bring brands such as Havaianas and Topshop to the United States and to feature then-emerging American fashion brands such as Proenza Schouler, Alexander Wang, and Rodarte. She went to the New York State Small Business Development Center at SUNY for assistance in refining their business plan and obtaining a business loan, and each contributed $10,000 of their own money towards Opening Ceremony.

Opening Ceremony features a rotating assortment of brands from different designers and is known for its collaborations with brands and personalities such as Pendleton, Levi's, Timberland, Keds, Robert Clergerie, Chloë Sevigny, and Spike Jonze. The stores also feature Opening Ceremony's eponymous brand.

In July 2011, Kenzo parent company LVMH announced the appointment of Lim as co-creative director of the brand. Lim debuted her collection in 2012: It was inspired by upstate New York and the painter Ellsworth Kelly.

Lim is a member of the Council of Fashion Designers of America and an advisor at Parsons School of Design in Manhattan.

Personal life
Lim is married to British filmmaker Matthew Killip; the couple have two daughters.

See also
 Koreans in New York City

References

External links
 Opening Ceremony website
 Kenzo website

American fashion designers
American company founders
American women company founders

1975 births
Living people
California people in fashion
American people of Korean descent
LVMH people
Artists from Los Angeles
University of California, Berkeley alumni
21st-century American businesspeople
21st-century American businesswomen
American women fashion designers